Hyalophora is a genus of moths in the family Saturniidae. The genus was erected by James Duncan and John O. Westwood in 1841.

Species
Hyalophora cecropia (Linnaeus, 1758) – cecropia moth
Hyalophora columbia (S.I. Smith, 1865) – Columbia silkmoth or larch silkmoth
Hyalophora euryalus (Boisduval, 1855) – ceanothus silkmoth
Hyalophora gloveri Strecker, 1872 – Glover's silkmoth
Hyalophora leonis (Naumann, Nassig & Nogueira, 2014)
Hyalophora mexicana (Nässig, Nogueira G. & Naumann, 2014)

References

 
Saturniinae
Moth genera